Adrian Piccoli (born 24 March 1970) is a former Australian politician who represented the electoral district of Murray in the New South Wales Legislative Assembly from 2015 to 2017, and the district of Murrumbidgee from 1999 to 2015. He was the deputy leader of the Nationals in the New South Wales Parliament from 2008 to 2016. Piccoli served as the Minister for Education between April 2011 and January 2017, in both the O'Farrell and Baird ministries.

Personal life

Of Italian descent, Piccoli was born in Griffith. He completed a Bachelor of Economics and a Bachelor of Laws at the Australian National University in 1993.

Prior to starting his political career, Piccoli worked as an irrigation rice farmer and solicitor. He is married, has two children, and is a Roman Catholic.

Political career

Piccoli has represented Murrumbidgee for the Nationals since the 1999 state election. In 2008 he became the deputy leader of the National Party in the NSW Parliament. He was included in the Shadow Ministry of the O'Farrell/Stoner Liberal/Nationals Coalition.

Following the Coalition victory in the 2011 New South Wales election, Piccoli was chosen by Premier Barry O'Farrell and Nationals Deputy Premier Andrew Stoner to be part of their cabinet as the Minister for Education.

When Deputy Premier and Nationals leader Andrew Stoner announced his resignation in 2014, Piccoli as Stoner's deputy was expected to stand as a candidate to succeed him as Nationals leader but chose not to nominate for the leadership and instead remained deputy to new leader Troy Grant. It is believed that Piccoli did not have the numbers to beat Grant for the leadership, despite Grant's political inexperience. Stoner had endorsed Grant over Piccoli as his successor.

In 2016 Grant resigned as Deputy Premier and Nationals leader but Piccoli again did not stand for the leadership and instead stood down as deputy leader.

Piccoli has promoted an educational reform called "Local Schools, Local Decisions" to give state schools more authority.

Following a January 2017 reshuffle of the Berejiklian ministry, Piccoli was not appointed to the new ministry and issued a statement that he had ruled out resigning from politics before the next election.

Ethics classes
Ethics classes were introduced by the Keneally Labor government as an alternative for children who did not want to attend traditional scripture classes. Prior to the 2011 state election, Barry O'Farrell made a pre-election pledge of not scrapping the ethics classes. Following the election, Fred Nile, who was vehemently opposed to the ethics classes, introduced a private members bill proposing the abolition of the classes, arguing that the ethics course is based on a philosophy linked to Nazism and communism.

Mike Baird's coalition government won the 2015 state election, promising to lease parts of the electricity grid to private operators, while Fred Nile held the balance of power in the upper house. While negotiating the lease of the electricity grid, Mike Baird announced changes to scripture enrolment forms, with the availability of ethics classes removed from forms sent to parents. The existence of ethics classes would only be made known to parents in a secondary form if they had chosen no scripture classes.  The form would also remove the "no" box that allows parents to opt out of scripture classes for their children, making them tick no box. The changes were described as 'misleading and deceptive' by Anglican minister John Dickson. Adrian Piccoli's department blocked access to the chairman of Primary Ethics, despite holding meetings with faith-based lobby groups.

The government made the enrolment process more complex in 2016, requiring parents to fill in multiple forms before being made aware that ethics classes are an option.

Resignation
On 4 September 2017, Piccoli announced he was resigning from parliament to accept a position at the University of New South Wales. He resigned on 15 September, triggering a by-election in his seat of Murray.

Later career
Piccoli is now the director of the Gonski Institute for Education at UNSW, and Professor of Practice in the School of Education.

References

1970 births
Living people
Members of the New South Wales Legislative Assembly
National Party of Australia members of the Parliament of New South Wales
Australian National University alumni
People from Griffith, New South Wales
Australian politicians of Italian descent
21st-century Australian politicians